Imilia is a village in West Champaran district in the Indian state of Bihar.

Demographics
As of 2011 India census, Imilia had a population of 359 in 62 households. Males constitute 53.76% of the population and females 46.23%. Imilia has an average literacy rate of 53.76%, lower than the national average of 74%: male literacy is 55.4%, and female literacy is 44.5%. In Imilia, 20% of the population is under 6 years of age.

References

Villages in West Champaran district